Tower Butte is a 5,287-foot (1,611 meter) elevation sandstone summit located south of Lake Powell, in northern Arizona. Tower Butte is a butte composed of Romana and Entrada Sandstones with a Morrison Formation caprock. Precipitation runoff from this feature drains into Lake Powell, which is part of the Colorado River drainage basin. The first ascent of Tower Butte was made October 23, 1994, by Jason Keith and David Insley. However, they were not the first to visit the summit as they reported finding litter from prior helicopter landings. An outfit operating out of Page flies helicopter sightseeing flights which land on the flat top of the butte where tourists have panoramic views of the Glen Canyon National Recreation Area, Lake Powell, and Navajo Mountain.

Climate

According to the Köppen climate classification system, Tower Butte is located in an arid climate zone with hot, very dry summers, and chilly winters with very little snow. It is located in the southern edge of the Great Basin Desert on the Colorado Plateau. Spring and fall are the most favorable seasons to visit.

Gallery

See also
 Colorado Plateau
 List of rock formations in the United States

References

External links

 Weather forecast: Tower Butte
 Tower Butte Rock Climbing: Mountainproject.com
 Tower Butte helicopter tour: YouTube

Colorado Plateau
Landforms of Coconino County, Arizona
Geography of the Navajo Nation
North American 1000 m summits
Rock formations of Arizona
Sandstone formations of the United States